Ian Waddell is a retired amateur Scottish football forward who appeared in the Scottish League for Hamilton Academical, Queen's Park and Airdrieonians. He was capped by Scotland at amateur level.

References 

Scottish footballers
Scottish Football League players
Queen's Park F.C. players
Association football forwards
Scotland amateur international footballers
Airdrieonians F.C. (1878) players
Hamilton Academical F.C. players
People educated at Rutherglen Academy
Rutherglen Glencairn F.C. players
Place of birth missing
Year of birth missing